The men's individual normal hill/10 km competition in Nordic combined at the 2023 Winter World University Games was held on 13 January, at the Lake Placid Olympic Ski Jumping Complex and Lake Placid Olympic Sports Complex Cross Country Biathlon Center.

Results

Ski jumping
The ski jumping part will be held at 14:15.

Cross-country

The cross-country part will be held at 19:00.

References

Nordic combined at the 2023 Winter World University Games